Morgan Ringland Wise (June 7, 1825 – April 13, 1903) was a member of the 46th and 47th Congress of the United States.

Wise was born in West Bethlehem, Pennsylvania.  He engaged in gold mining in California in 1850 and while there volunteered under Major Stammins, to defend the miners against Indians.  He returned to Pennsylvania where he graduated from Waynesburg College in 1856. He spent several years engaged in agricultural pursuits.

He was elected as a member of the Pennsylvania House of Representatives, serving from 1874 to 1878. Later he was elected as a Democrat to the 46th and 47th Congress. He did not seek re-election in 1882.

Wise moved to Arizona where he became a rancher and raised cattle.  He was appointed as consular agent at Nogales, Mexico from February 10, 1888 to May 31, 1900. On August 6, 1896, he was witness to a failed bank robbery in Nogales, Arizona, while attending a meeting in the bank.

Following his appointment, he returned to the East, where he died a few years later in Coraopolis, Pennsylvania. His body was taken to Waynesburg, Pennsylvania, for burial.

See also
Skeleton Canyon Shootout

References

Sources

The Political Graveyard

1825 births
1903 deaths
Democratic Party members of the Pennsylvania House of Representatives
People from Coraopolis, Pennsylvania
Waynesburg University alumni
Democratic Party members of the United States House of Representatives from Pennsylvania
19th-century American politicians